Man-sik, also spelled Man-shik, is a Korean masculine given name. Its meaning differs based on the hanja used to write each syllable of the name. There are 19 hanja with the reading "man" and 16 hanja with the reading "sik" on the South Korean government's official list of hanja which may be registered for use in given names.

People with this name include:
Cho Man-sik (1884–1950), Korean independence activist
Chae Man-sik (1902–1950), Korean novelist
Kim Man-sig (1940 or 1942 – 2013), South Korean fencer
Jung Man-sik (born 1975), South Korean actor

See also
List of Korean given names

References

Korean masculine given names